Commonwealth Navy may refer to:

 Royal Navy, the successor of the navy of the 17th-century Commonwealth of England
 Polish–Lithuanian Commonwealth Navy, the naval forces of Poland-Lithuania in the early 17th century